The badge of the Royal Air Force is the heraldic emblem used to represent the Royal Air Force (RAF). It features an eagle superimposed on a circlet, which is surmounted by a crown.

Description
The badge was based on a design by a tailor at Gieves Ltd of Savile Row in London. It was first used in August 1918, and the original circlet showed a garter and buckle. The present plain circlet dates from 26 January 1923 when the badge was registered at the College of Arms and, it being noted that the garter and buckle were heraldically incorrect, a substitution was made.

In heraldic terms, the badge is blazoned as: "In front of a circle inscribed with the motto Per Ardua Ad Astra and ensigned by the Imperial Crown an eagle volant and affronté head lowered and to the sinister." Although there have been debates among airmen over the years about whether the bird was originally meant to be an albatross or an eagle, the consensus is that it was always an eagle. When the badge was issued by the College of Arms in 1923, they described the bird as being an eagle.

The badge is depicted on the iron gates at the ceremonial entrance to the Royal Air Force College Cranwell, at the entrance to the Air Forces Memorial in Surrey, and on the Polish War Memorial in London.

Related badges
Numerous Commonwealth air forces have adopted badges that are directly based upon the RAF badge, whilst several other countries' air forces have adopted badges with similar imagery. Several are shown below.

Current

Former

See also
 Heraldic badges of the Royal Air Force
 Royal Air Force Ensign

References

External links

 Royal Air Force badge (archived on 30 April 2009)

Military heraldry
Royal Air Force
Badges